Nagpur Metro is a rapid transit system for the city of Nagpur, Maharashtra, India. It is estimated to cost . In February 2014, the Government of Maharashtra gave approval for the Metro Project, while the Government of India's Ministry of Urban Development had given "In Principle" approval for the Project. On 20 August 2014, Union Cabinet gave approval for the development of project, and Prime Minister Narendra Modi laid foundation stone on 21 August on his visit to the city. Construction on the project began on 31 May 2015, with trial run beginning on 30 September 2017.

Prime minister Narendra Modi inaugurated operations on Nagpur Metro on 8 March 2019 via video conferencing along with Chief Minister of Maharashtra, Devendra Fadnavis and Union Cabinet Minister Nitin Gadkari.

Nagpur Metro becomes 13th Metro system in India to be operational. It is also being touted as the greenest metro rail in India.

On 21 August 2021, Maharashtra Chief Minister Uddhav Thackeray inaugurated a  expansion between Sitabuldi and Kasturchand Park. This featured the Zero Mile Freedom Park station which has a 60,000-sq ft park and a 20-storey building, designed by a French architect.
On 11 December 2022 Prime Minister Narendra Modi inaugurated phase 1 of Nagpur Metro completely and start phase 2 of Nagpur Metro.

History
The project was conceived during the year 2012, when cities having population of more than 20 lakh were made eligible for having a metro rail system. This decision by the government had made 12 cities in India eligible for the metro rail, including Nagpur. Kamal Nath, then Union minister for urban development, then proposed a metro rail in Nagpur and called for a detailed project report from the state government.
On 22 February 2012, the Nagpur Improvement Trust (NIT) signed an agreement with Delhi Metro Rail Corporation (DMRC) to prepare the Detailed Project Report (DPR) for the metro rail in Nagpur. The Central Ministry had allocated  to the State Government for carrying out the DPR work.

Special Purpose Vehicle

To execute the project, the Cabinet approved setting up of Nagpur Metro Rail Corporation Limited (NMRCL) now known as Maharashtra Metro Rail Corporation Limited(MAHA-METRO). Maha Metro is a Special Purpose Vehicle (SPV) created for the smooth implementation and operations of the Nagpur Metro Rail Project and is a joint venture of the Government of India and the Government of Maharashtra, with 50:50 equity. Maha Metro shall be solely responsible for the successful and timely completion of the project and its subsequent operations.

Phase 1

Detailed Project Report
DMRC submitted the report to the nodal agency Nagpur Improvement Trust on 12 February 2013. The total cost of the project was estimated at around 9,000 crore. The project consisted of two routes: Automotive square, Kamptee to MIHAN Metro depot and Prajapati Nagar, East Wardhaman Nagar to Lokmanya Nagar, Hingna. There would be 17 stations on Route no. 1 with a terminal cum depot at MIHAN and 19 stations on Route no. 2 with a terminal cum depot at Lokmanya Nagar. A cross major station was proposed at Munje Square where the two routes would meet and the commuter would be able to exchange the routes.

It was expected that 12.21 percent of Nagpur's estimated population of 29 lakh in 2021, i.e., around 3,63,000 commuters would use the Metro by 2021.

To provide first and last mile connectivity, feeder services such as shuttle buses, battery operated vehicles, pedestrian facilities and bicycle sharing schemes were included in the project. Feeder services would enhance the accessibility of the Metro for all classes of commuters, to and from homes and offices.

Metro Rail Expenditure

The Total Expenditure of the Project is estimated to ₹8,680 crore with the Central Government and State Government each contributing 20% share in the form of equity and subordinate debt. Nagpur Municipal Corporation and Nagpur Improvement Trust each giving 5% share of the expenditure while the rest 50% is being financed by loan.

Recently, KfW, a German government-owned development bank, has approved a loan of 3,700 crores to NMRCL as a part of fund required for the project. An additional ₹444 crore loan will also be provided for funding the proposed feeder service and solar energy installation of Nagpur Metro Rail on mere concessional terms of KfW Germany. The remaining requirement of about €130 million for the entire project has been funded by AFD France. The 20-year credit, is used for funding signalling, telecommunication, automatic fare collection systems, lifts and escalators.

Proposed Alignment by DMRC
Thereafter, DMRC conducted Traffic Surveys, Topographical Surveys, Geotechnical Investigations and Environment Impact Assessment Survey. The study area consisted of Nagpur Municipal Corporation Area. Based on the different types of surveys done by DMRC, metro alignments were finalised after repeated inspection of the road network, intersections, passenger traffic flow, traffic congestion, connectivity to important land uses.

Realignment of route
On 3 August 2013, a meeting was held at Nagpur by authorities of Ministry for Urban Development to discuss the DPR of Nagpur Metro. In that meeting, the Joint Secretary of MoUD had expressed that the Financial Internal Rate of Return (FIRR) of the project should be at least 8% since the Ministry had already issued an advisory that FIRR of metro project should not be below 8%. On 1 October 2013, a presentation on the DPR was made by NIT to The Chief Minister, Government of Maharashtra. The Chief Minister was of the opinion to avoid underground alignment in MIHAN and also construct Maintenance Depot in the land belonging to State Govt Land.

Subsequently, on 21 October 2013, a joint inspection of the North South corridor was done by MADC, NIT and DMRC. The original alignment of Corridor-I proposed was passing through Khamla Road, Airport Area after Sahakar Nagar and finally was ending at MIHAN. The alignment up to old airport station was elevated, then for a length of  it was underground with one underground station named as New Airport Station and again elevated in MIHAN Area. Since the cost of underground section of the alignment is much more than the elevated section or the section at grade, alternative alignment was suggested for cost reduction, enhancement in PHPDT and to increase FIRR so that project becomes financially and economically viable. From the intersection at Wardha road, the elevated alignment was proposed to be on the central divider on the Wardha Road. After crossing existing intersection point of Wardha Road & Airport Road, the alignment was to be shifted to the MIHAN area.

Alignment in this portion was proposed to be at grade and to run parallel to Wardha Road up to ROB and abutting railway line thereafter up-to proposed Car depot. As acquiring of these properties will be very tough and may delay the whole project, hence to avoid all such situation, it was decided to take the alignment on Wardha Road only without going on Khamla Road. This decision changed the alignment, and it was decided that North-South Corridor will pass through Wardha Road after Congress Nagar Metro Station. After crossing existing intersection point of Wardha Road & Airport Road, it was decided that the alignment will be shifted to the MIHAN area and alignment in this portion would be at grade and will run parallel to Wardha Road up to ROB and parallel to railway line thereafter up-to proposed Car Depot. MADC land of area  was available on the west side of railway line and south of existing flyover near Khapri station. This MADC land would be utilised for Car Depot. Similarly, Depot of East-West Corridor had also been shifted to SRPF land near proposed Lokmanya Nagar Metro Station.

This has caused deletion of few earlier proposed metro stations on North-South Corridor and addition of new stations on the same.

Conflict with MSRDC
As per the plan of east–west corridor of the Nagpur Metro, the route from east side of the Nagpur Railway station passes through the same road as that of the place where the Ram Jhula phase II was under construction. This led to a conflict between MSRDC and NMRCL regarding the position of pillars for their respective projects. Even after several meetings no solution came out. The matter was discussed in the High court of Nagpur Bench during the hearing of a PIL filled by Nagpur Chamber of Commerce Ltd (NCCL) for early completion of Ram Jhula, the six-lane cable-stayed railway over-bridge near Santra Market that was pending since nine years. High Court then directed both the parties to submit their plans to superintendent engineer of Public Works Department (PWD), based in Mumbai. The High Court also urged the Chief Minister to resolve the deadlock over Ram Jhula. In response, Devendra Fadnavis, Chief Minister of Maharashtra, assured that there would be an early resolve on the ongoing conflict between NMRCL and MSRDC. After some meetings between officials of NMRCL and MSRDC, which Chief Minister facilitated, both parties found a solution on the conflict. As per the new plan NMRCL jointly decided with Maharashtra State Road Development Corporation (MSRDC) to lay the metro rail track between two spans of Ramjhula. This alignment, although technically challenging, renders demolition of part of the Indira Gandhi  Government Medical College and Hospital (IGGMCH) unnecessary, and will not disturb the Poddareshwar Ram Temple either.

Phase 2

Detailed Project Report
Maharashtra Metro Rail Corporation in early 2018 had started plans for phase 2 of Nagpur Metro by appointing RITES to prepare detailed project report for future routes. The DPR was to submitted by April 2018 but got delayed. RITES in the DPR has envisioned five routes for metro rail.

The DPR was submitted to Urban Development Department(UDD) of Government of Maharashtra in July 2018 by Maharashtra Metro Rail Corporation. The phase 2 was approved in January 2019 by the State Government.

Network

Present Network

Nagpur Metro Lines

Line 1: Orange Line (North-South Corridor)
(Rail Length:; No of Stations:20)
This corridor originates from Automotive Square on Kamptee Road; moves along Kamptee Road and reaches the intersection point of Amravati Road and Wardha Road, then after crossing fly over moves towards Munje Square, moves towards Dhantoli and along nala moves towards Empire/Dr Munje Marg, leads towards Congress Nagar T-Point, then on Rahate Colony Road and then falls on Wardha Road, leads towards NEERI, then moves along Wardha Road and then west of Railway Track in MIHAN area.

There are 20 stations on this corridor of which 15 stations are elevated and 5 stations are at Grade. Sitaburdi Station is an inter-change station.

This line initially started operations partially between Sitabuldi to Khapri since 8 March 2019.

Line 2: Aqua Line (East-West Corridor)
(Rail Length:; No of Stations:20)
This corridor originates from Prajapati Nagar and runs westwards, through Vaishnodevi Square, Ambedkar Square, Telephone Exchange, Chittar Oli Square, Agarsen Square, Doser Vaisya Square, Nagpur Railway Station, Sitaburdi, Jhansi Rani Square, Institute of Engineers, Shankar Nagar Square, Lad Square, Dharmpeth College, Subhash Nagar, Rachna (Ring road Junction), Vasudev Nagar, Bansi Nagar to Lokmanya Nagar. The entire corridor is elevated.

There are 20 stations on this corridor. All stations are elevated stations and Sitaburdi station is an Interchange Station.

The DMRC in its Detailed Project Report (DPR) submitted to Nagpur Improvement Trust has suggested to start the construction work on both the routes simultaneously contradicting the prior suggestion of phase wise development.

This line initially started operations partially between Sitabuldi to Lokmanya Nagar since 28 January 2020.

Status updates
 November 2013: Detailed Project Report final version submitted.
 August 2014: Union Cabinet approved the project.

Orange Line: North-South Corridor
 November 2015: Work started on construction of depot.
 January 2016: Work started on Wardha Road.
 August 2016: Work started on Ajni road. (near Ajni railway station).
 September 2016: Work started on back side of Nagpur railway station.
 October 2016: Work started Near Ambazari Lake.
 October 2016: Work started on Sitabuldi Interchange Station (Munje Square).
 December 2016: Work started for Construction of Depot at MIHAN on the N-S Corridor.
 January 2017: Work Started on Zero Mile Station.
 August 2017: Trial run started till Airport Station.
 September 2017: First trial run was conducted on a 5.6 km section between MIHAN area and Khapri station.
 April 2018: Second and Final inspection of CMRS for clearance.
 December 2018: Work progressing in all sections but Metro may miss March 2019 deadline.
 January 2019: The first metro train from China reached metro depot in Nagpur.
 February 2019: Trial run begins.
 3 March 2019: CMRS inspection carried out.
8 March 2019: Prime Minister Narendra Modi inaugurated metro between Sitabuldi to Khapri via video conferencing.
August 2021: Maharashtra Chief Minister Uddhav Thackeray inaugurated a 1.6 km expansion between Sitabuldi and Kasturchand Park.
11 December 2022: Prime Minister Narendra Modi inaugurated the rest of the section of the Orange Line of Nagpur Metro phase I.

Aqua Line: East-West Corridor
 December 2016: Work started on East-West Corridor.
 August 2019: A trial run from Subhash Nagar to Sitabuldi was held on 15 August 2019. CMRS inspection to be held on 30 August 2019 and metro on Aqua Line to start in September 2019.
 September 2019: Inauguration of Aqua line by Prime Minister Narendra Modi got postponed due to heavy rains. Inauguration to happen after 2019 Maharashtra Legislative Assembly election in October 2019.
28 January 2020: CM Uddhav Thackeray and few Union Ministers inaugurated the commercial services on metro between Sitabuldi to Lokmanya Nagar via video conferencing.
11 December 2022: Prime Minister Narendra Modi inaugurated the rest of the section of the Aqua Line of Nagpur Metro phase I.

Nagpur Metro MAHA Card 
State Bank of India and Maharashtra Metro Rail Corporation Limited (MMRCL) has introduced Metro MAHA Card Service to metro passengers.

Through this Metro card service, passengers can travel without the hassle of being in the ticket queue. An EVM chip based card can be recharged in a range of Rs.100 to Rs.2000 and in multiples of 100. Metro passengers can get 10% off on their fares if transactions are made through cards.

Achievements
 On 01 January 2023, Nagpur Metro made the record for highest single-day ridership of 2,20,415 passengers.

Network Map

See also 
 Urban rail transit in India
 Nagpur broad-gauge Metro
 Greater Nashik Metro
 Mumbai Metro
 Pune Metro
 Thane Metro

References

External links

 
2019 establishments in Maharashtra
25 kV AC railway electrification